The Journal of Hellenic Studies is an annual peer-reviewed academic journal covering research in Hellenic studies. It also publishes reviews of recent books of importance to Hellenic studies. It was established in 1880 and is published by Cambridge University Press on behalf of the Society for the Promotion of Hellenic Studies. The editor-in-chief is Lin Foxhall (University of Liverpool).

Editors
The following persons have been editors-in-chief of the journal:
Percy Gardner, 1879-1895
Ernest Arthur Gardner, 1897-1932
Roger Brock, 2011-2016
Douglas Cairns, 2016-2021

References

External links
 
 Hathi Trust. Journal of Hellenic Studies, 1880-

Classics journals
Publications established in 1880
English-language journals
Annual journals
Cambridge University Press academic journals
Historiography of Greece
Academic journals associated with learned and professional societies